The second cabinet of Gheorghe Mironescu was the government of Romania from 10 October 1930 to 17 April 1931.

Ministers
The ministers of the cabinet were as follows:

President of the Council of Ministers:
Gheorghe Mironescu (10 October 1930 - 17 April 1931)
Minister of the Interior: 
Ion Mihalache (10 October 1930 - 17 April 1931)
Minister of Foreign Affairs: 
Gheorghe Mironescu (10 October 1930 - 17 April 1931)
Minister of Finance:
Mihai Popovici (10 October 1930 - 17 April 1931)
Minister of Justice:
Grigore Iunian (10 October - 19 November 1930)
Voicu Nițescu (19 November 1930 - 17 April 1931)
Minister of Public Instruction and Religious Affairs:
Nicolae Costăchescu (10 October 1930 - 17 April 1931)
Minister of the Army:
Gen. Nicolae Condeescu (10 October 1930 - 17 April 1931)
Minister of Agriculture and Property:
Virgil Madgearu (10 October 1930 - 17 April 1931)
Minister of Industry and Commerce:
Mihail Manoilescu (10 October 1930 - 17 April 1931)
Minister of Public Works and Communications:
Voicu Nițescu (10 October - 19 November 1930)
Ion Răducanu (19 November 1930 - 17 April 1931)
Minister of Labour, Health, and Social Security:
Emil Hațieganu (10 October 1930 - 17 April 1931)

Minister of State:
Pantelimon Halippa (10 October 1930 - 17 April 1931)

References

Cabinets of Romania
Cabinets established in 1930
Cabinets disestablished in 1931
1930 establishments in Romania
1931 disestablishments in Romania